Mark Rudolph MacGuigan,  (February 17, 1931 – January 12, 1998) was a Canadian academic and politician.

Born in Charlottetown, Prince Edward Island, the son of Mark Rudolph MacGuigan and Agnes Violet Trainor, he was educated at Saint Dunstan's University (B.A.), the University of Toronto (M.A., Ph.D. (Philosophy)), Osgoode Hall Law School (LL.B.), and Columbia University (LL.M., J.S.D.)  He was a professor at Osgoode and the University of Toronto and was dean of law at the University of Windsor.

MacGuigan was elected as a Liberal Party candidate to the House of Commons of Canada in the 1968 general election. He was re-elected in 1972, 1974, 1979, and 1980.

In 1976, he took a turn at provincial politics and ran for the leadership of the Ontario Liberal Party. He lost to Stuart Smith at the leadership convention.

In 1980, he was appointed Secretary of State for External Affairs in the cabinet of Prime Minister Pierre Trudeau. He became Minister of Justice and Attorney General of Canada in 1982.

When Trudeau announced his retirement as Liberal leader and prime minister, MacGuigan ran to succeed him at the 1984 Liberal leadership convention. He placed fifth. He retired from politics following the convention, and became a judge on the federal Court of Appeal.

He died in Oklahoma City of liver cancer in 1998.

Further reading

References 
 

1931 births
1998 deaths
Lawyers in Ontario
Columbia Law School alumni
Canadian legal scholars
University of Toronto alumni
Academic staff of the University of Toronto
Canadian university and college faculty deans
Liberal Party of Canada MPs
Members of the House of Commons of Canada from Ontario
Members of the King's Privy Council for Canada
Politicians from Windsor, Ontario
People from Charlottetown
Liberal Party of Canada leadership candidates
Canadian Secretaries of State for External Affairs
Prince Edward Island candidates for Member of Parliament